Stephanie Walker (born 28 February 1994) is an Australian rules footballer who played for the Greater Western Sydney Giants in the AFL Women's competition. Walker was drafted by Greater Western Sydney with their 15th selection and 113th overall in the 2016 AFL Women's draft. She played three matches in her debut season. She was delisted at the end of the 2017 season. In 2019, Walker will play for the Eagles in the SANFLW competition.

References

External links 

1994 births
Living people
Greater Western Sydney Giants (AFLW) players
Australian rules footballers from New South Wales